This is a list of the members of the 12th Seanad Éireann, the upper house of the Oireachtas (legislature) of Ireland.  These Senators were elected or appointed in 1969, after the 1969 general election and served until the close of poll for the 13th Seanad in 1973.

Composition of the 12th Seanad
There are a total of 60 seats in the Seanad. 43 Senators are elected by the Vocational panels, 6 elected by the Universities and 11 are nominated by the Taoiseach.

The following table shows the composition by party when the 12th Seanad first met on 5 November 1969.

List of senators

Changes

See also
Members of the 19th Dáil
Government of the 19th Dáil

References

External links

 
12